Ilsan Lake Park is a city park in Janghang-dong, Ilsan-gu district, Goyang city, Gyeonggi-do Province, South Korea.

History and layout 
It was constructed over a period of about 3 years (from Jan 1993 to Dec 1995).

The park was designed to provide natural-looking spaces for outdoor recreation in an urban area that is isolated from natural water and trees.

Features 
Ilsan Lake Park is divided into two parts by Dal-ma-ji island which is located in the middle of the lake. The northern part is built around a real natural lake with much of the original plant growth retained. The southern part is an artificial lake with many squares and fountains. 

There is an octagonal pavilion on Dal-ma-ji island called "Wal-pa-jung". In the middle of the park, there is the Go-sa fountain which spouts over 10 m high during the daytime in the summer. Also in the middle of the park, there is Han-ul square, which is occasionally used for rollerblade contests or by a skateboarding club.

There are several recreational facilities, such as a promenade road, bicycle path, inline skating, walking, and jogging trails that encircle the lake. Ilsan Lake Park also features a large variety of wild flowers and plants, such as cactus, arboretum and botanical gardens. 

It is the venue for the annual Goyang International Flower Festival. It was the filming location of Seoul Broadcasting System's drama Star's Lover.

References 

Parks in Gyeonggi Province
Artificial lakes
Lakes of South Korea
Goyang